Antoaneta Ivanova Todorova-Selenska (born 8 June 1963) is a retired female javelin thrower from Bulgaria, who set the world record and the world's best year performance in 1981. She made her mark (71.88 m) at a meet in Zagreb on 15 August 1981.

Todorova was born in Samovodene, Veliko Tarnovo, and competed in three Summer Olympics (1980, 1988 and 1992).

International competitions

References
 
 

1963 births
Living people
Sportspeople from Veliko Tarnovo Province
Bulgarian female javelin throwers
Olympic athletes of Bulgaria
Athletes (track and field) at the 1980 Summer Olympics
Athletes (track and field) at the 1988 Summer Olympics
Athletes (track and field) at the 1992 Summer Olympics
World record setters in athletics (track and field)
World Athletics Championships athletes for Bulgaria
Friendship Games medalists in athletics